Continental Portugal or mainland Portugal comprises the bulk of the Portuguese Republic, namely that part on the Iberian Peninsula and so in Continental Europe, having approximately 95% of the total population and 96.6% of the country's land. Mainland Portugal is therefore commonly called by residents of the Portuguese archipelagos of the Azores and Madeira the continent in all respects including minor elements of combined governance from Lisbon, the country's capital. Before 1975, when the Portuguese territory also stretched to several now-independent states in Africa, the designation metropolis was also used.

Context
The designation mainland Portugal is used to differentiate the continental territory of Portugal from its insular territory. The latter comprises the archipelagos of Madeira and Azores in the Atlantic Ocean. The Azores and Madeira are also commonly referred to as the autonomous regions, insular Portugal or, simply, the islands.

Continental Portugal is divided into 18 districts. Outside of these the islands of Madeira and the Azores are the Autonomous Regions of Portugal.

The European Nomenclature of Territorial Units for Statistics defines the geographic plurality of the mainland Portugal and the islands as the primary NUTS I territorial division (see administrative divisions of Portugal: NUTS for details).

While in modern Portugal the difference between European continental and total territory is minor (in terms of area), it mattered during the existence of the Portuguese Empire, when the distinction was more frequently made, such as in the colonisation of Brazil.

Districts

EU Statistical Regions (NUTS II)

See also 
 Administrative divisions of Portugal
 Autonomous Regions of Portugal
 Districts of Portugal
 Exclusive economic zone of Portugal
 List of regions and sub-regions of Portugal
 Pluricontinentalism

Subdivisions of Portugal
NUTS 1 statistical regions of the European Union
Portugal